A stepper is a device used in the manufacture of integrated circuits.

Stepper may also refer to:

 Stepper motor, a type of electric motor
 Wilhelm Stepper, Austro-Hungarian novelist (1899 – after 1941)
 Stepper (Transformers), a fictional character

See also 
 Steppers (music), a style of reggae
 SXS or Strowger switch, an early type of stepping switch